The 2021–22 Scottish Challenge Cup known as the SPFL Trust Trophy due to sponsorship reasons, was the 30th season of the competition. The total number of participating clubs was 50, down from 58, with only Scottish clubs competing due to the COVID-19 pandemic in Scotland. The competition began on 10 August 2021 with the First Round and ended on 3 April 2022 with the final at the Excelsior Stadium in Airdrie, North Lanarkshire.

Thirty teams from the Championship, League One and League Two competed, along with four teams from the Highland Football League and four from the Lowland Football League. In addition to this, Under-21 teams of the clubs competing in the Scottish Premiership were represented. This season no clubs from Northern Ireland, Wales, Republic of Ireland or England entered the competition to reduce unnecessary travel during the COVID-19 pandemic.

Format

First round
The first round featured 6 clubs from 2020–21 Scottish League One, all clubs from 2020–21 Scottish League Two, 4 clubs from the 2020–21 Scottish Highland Football League, 4 clubs from the 2020–21 Scottish Lowland Football League and the 12 Under 21 teams of the 2021–22 Scottish Premiership.

The draw was made on 6 July 2021 at 14:00 and was broadcast live on the SPFL YouTube Channel. The draw was regionalised and seeded. Matches were played on 10, 11 and 17 August 2021.

Livingston and Ross County were unable to field B teams for the first round and withdrew from the competition. Their scheduled opponents, Albion Rovers and Stirling Albion, were awarded byes into the second round.

North Section

Draw
Teams that entered the competition in the first round.

Matches

South Section

Draw
Teams that entered the competition in the first round.

Matches

Notes

Second round
The second round featured the 18 first round winners who were joined by all teams from the 2020–21 Scottish Championship and the top four teams from the 2020–21 Scottish League One. 

The draw was made on 6 July 2021 at 14:00 and was broadcast live on the SPFL YouTube Channel. The draw was regionalised and seeded. Matches were played on 31 August, 3, 4, 5 and 14 September 2021.

North section

Draw
Teams that entered the competition in the second round.

Matches

Notes

South section

Draw
Teams that entered the competition in the second round.

Matches

Notes

Final stages
On 7 July 2021, a bracket was published for the rest of the tournament, from the third round (last 16) onwards.

Bracket

Third round
The third round featured the 16 second round winners and matches were played on 6, 8, 9 and 27 October 2021.

Matches

Quarter-finals
The quarter-finals were played on 30 November and 1 December 2021.

Matches

Semi-finals
The semi-finals are to be played on 1 and 2 March 2022.

Matches

Final

The final took place on 3 April 2022.

Notes
Notes

References

Challenge Cup
Scottish Challenge Cup seasons
Challenge Cup